Daluyong ("Tidal Wave" or "Wave") is a 1976 Tagalog-language novel written by Filipino novelist Lazaro Francisco.  The novel was published in Quezon City, Manila, in the Philippines by the Ateneo de Manila University Press.

Plot
Daluyong begins where Francisco’s novel Maganda pa ang Daigdig ("The World Be Beautiful Still") ends. Lino Rivero, a former ranch worker, is given an opportunity to own a portion of land by the priest Padre Echevarria.  Lino becomes an avatar who, through his efforts and good will, is able to free himself from the oppressive "tenant farmer" system.  Apart from the "waves of changes" that might happen due to agrarian reform and because of the hope of the Filipino lower class for a good future, Daluyong tackled the "waves of forces" that prevents such changes and hopes from being realized.

See also
Sugat ng Alaala

References

External links
Daluyong by Lázaro Francisco at Google Books

Philippine novels
1986 novels
Political novels
Tagalog-language novels
Novels set in the Philippines